Sabrina Seminatore (born 18 March 1964) is an Italian former swimmer who competed in the 1980 Summer Olympics.

References

1964 births
Living people
Italian female swimmers
Italian female breaststroke swimmers
Olympic swimmers of Italy
Swimmers at the 1980 Summer Olympics
Place of birth missing (living people)
Mediterranean Games gold medalists for Italy
Mediterranean Games medalists in swimming
Swimmers at the 1983 Mediterranean Games
Swimmers at the 1979 Mediterranean Games
20th-century Italian women